William Ayache (born 10 January 1961) is a French former professional footballer who played as a side back, both left and right, and then manager.

International career
At international level, Ayache participated at the 1984 Summer Olympics with the France national team, winning the gold medal, and was also a member of the team that finished third at the 1986 FIFA World Cup. All together, he was capped 20 times for his country.

Honours

Player
Nantes
Division 1: 1979–80, 1982–83

Montpellier
Coupe de France: 1989–90

France
Summer Olympic Games Gold Medal: 1984
FIFA World Cup third place: 1986
Artemio Franchi Cup: 1985

References

External links
 
 
 

1961 births
Living people
Footballers from Algiers
French footballers
France international footballers
Association football defenders
FC Nantes players
Paris Saint-Germain F.C. players
Olympique de Marseille players
FC Girondins de Bordeaux players
Montpellier HSC players
OGC Nice players
Nîmes Olympique players
AS Cannes players
Ligue 1 players
1986 FIFA World Cup players
Olympic footballers of France
Footballers at the 1984 Summer Olympics
Olympic gold medalists for France
Olympic medalists in football
Medalists at the 1984 Summer Olympics
French football managers
AS Cannes managers
Ligue 1 managers
French sportspeople of Algerian descent